Island Airways is a small passenger airline based in Charlevoix, Michigan. It provides services to Welke Airport and Charlevoix Municipal Airport.

History
The airline began in 1945 as McPhillips Flying Service.  In 1975, Welke Aviation was started in competition with McPhillips.  The two companies merged in 1983, and Paul Welke bought out his partners in 1989.  In 2001, Welke was instrumental in the location and rescue of a family that had been on a charter flight that crashed on approach to Beaver Island. In 2013, the Michigan Aeronautics Commission gave Welke an award in recognition of Island Air's long history of service.

Fleet
 Britten-Norman Islander
 Piper Apache PA-23-160
 Piper Aztec PA-23-250

Destinations
Welke Airport (Beaver Island, Michigan)
Charlevoix Municipal Airport

References

Regional airlines of the United States
Companies based in Michigan
Transportation in Charlevoix County, Michigan
Airlines based in Michigan
Airlines established in 1945
1945 establishments in Michigan